Ea Beck is a small river in South Yorkshire, England, that flows eastwards into the River Don at Thorpe-in-Balne. The Environment Agency lists the beck as starting at South Elmsall, but mapping lists the beck with several names along its course. The beck has twice flooded areas and villages that it passes through in the 21st century.

Toponymy
The derivation of the name Ea for the beck has at least two possibilities: Oliver Rackham suggested that the name Ea indicates a drained or altered river-course, which was a common Anglo-Saxon term for drained fenland rivers in East Anglia, Hampshire and the peatlands of Yorkshire around the River Don. Eilert Ekwall suggests the word ēa has the same route (Old Norse) and means just river, being used as a root for the rivers Eye, Ray, Rea and Yeo.

Catchment area overview
However, on Ordnance Survey mapping, it is labelled as The Beck, Hague Hall Beck, Smallholme and Tilts Drain, and Thorpe Marsh Drain.

The beck runs through a former coal mining area, though the river valleys is known for its magnesian limestone deposits around the Doncaster area.

Course
The name Ea Beck for the watercourse has different boundaries for different authorities. Near the headwaters tributaries, Wakefield Council refer to it is Ea Beck at South Kirkby, whereas on mapping it is shown as The Beck. Some of the becks feeding the western end of the river are known also as the Ea Beck Catchment. Other groups state that the name Ea Beck is the watercourse formed by the confluence of the River Skell and Hampole Dike. The course of the beck has been heavily altered, especially in its lower reaches, due to the coal seams found in that area which needed to be free from water ingress. Mining subsidence has led to the beck being modified with raised banks and pumps to effectively drain the water away. Colliery pumping programmes and raised banks along the river's course were implemented under the Doncaster Drainage Act of 1929.

The River Skell (or Skell Brook), which lends its name to Skellow and Skelbrooke, is a tributary of the Old Ea Beck between Skellow and Adwick le Street.

The river has four monitoring stations at (from west to east) South Elmsall, Adwick-le-Street, Norwood, and Norwood (downstream). The mouth of the river is at Thorpe-in-Balne, where the exit into the River Don is tide-locked with gates. The beck, along with the River Went, are the two main tributaries of the River Don, before it flows into the Ouse at Goole.

History
The beck is designated as a major river from Hague Hall Beck and Frickley Beck, to its outfall into the River Don at Thorpe in Balne. A long watercourse was taken from Ea Beck in the 1780s to power a corn mill at Adwick-le-Street.

As the beck is slow moving, the lower reaches nearer to the River Don are found with callitriche stagnalis. Flooding on the beck is quite common, though in June 2007, water overtopped the banks and inundated the villages of Toll Bar and Bentley. The tidal flood gates at the mouth of the River, were installed to prevent a backflow upriver from the Don. However, as that was already flooded with water from upstream in Sheffield, the gates remained closed and caused flooding along the Beck, causing problems in villages such as Toll Bar. South Yorkshire Fire and Rescue Service deployed firefighters to help pump water away from affected properties, in what was described as "the largest-ever peacetime fire service operation seen in Britain." This prompted the Environment Agency to invest over £3 million in flood defences along the river, which were completed in 2010. The beck was subject to flooding again in November 2019. The history of flooding on the beck has meant Doncaster Council rate the beck as one of its major rivers and as such is monitored closely for any weather events.

Settlements

South Kirkby
South Elmsall
Hampole
Skellow
Toll Bar
Bentley
Almholme
Thorpe in Balne

References

Sources

External links
Ea Beck live flood map
Map of the River Don lower catchment

Rivers of Doncaster
Rivers of Wakefield